Resaurie  is a village, that lies between Culloden and Westhill  in Inverness-shire, Scottish Highlands and is in the Scottish council area of Highland.

References

Populated places in Inverness committee area